Paulo Jorge Fernandes Sereno (born 24 October 1983 in Santarém, Portugal), known as Gutty Sereno, is a Portuguese professional footballer who plays for Vilafranquense as a midfielder.

External links

1983 births
People from Santarém, Portugal
Living people
Portuguese footballers
Association football midfielders
Kavala F.C. players
Portuguese expatriate footballers
Expatriate footballers in Greece
C.F. União players
Doxa Katokopias FC players
Expatriate footballers in Cyprus
Cypriot First Division players
Hibernians F.C. players
Expatriate footballers in Malta
Clube Oriental de Lisboa players
S.C.U. Torreense players
Atlético Clube de Portugal players
Liga Portugal 2 players
Expatriate footballers in Germany
Sportspeople from Santarém District